Adair County Free Press Building is a historic building located in Greenfield, Iowa, United States. Designed by architect John Karl, it was completed in 1903. The two-story brick structure features an asymmetrical facade with four round arched openings, and a corbelled brick cornice. It was built by Edwin J. Sidey and his father John S. Sidey, who founded the Adair County Democrat in 1889, and was later renamed the Adair County Free Press. Journalist Hugh Sidey was another of John S. Sidey's sons. The building is now a part of the adjacent Hotel Greenfield. It houses the restaurant, lounge, two hotel suites, and the laundry and housekeeping facilities. The building was individually listed on the National Register of Historic Places in 2011 as the Adair County Democrat–Adair County Free Press Building. In 2014 it was included as a contributing property in the Greenfield Public Square Historic District.

References

Newspaper headquarters in the United States
Newspaper buildings
Commercial buildings completed in 1903
Greenfield, Iowa
Buildings and structures in Adair County, Iowa
National Register of Historic Places in Adair County, Iowa
Commercial buildings on the National Register of Historic Places in Iowa
Individually listed contributing properties to historic districts on the National Register in Iowa